Rampersad Parasram (born 27 May 1944) is the current Dharmacharya of Trinidad and Tobago and is a religious leader, medical doctor, and politician in Trinidad and Tobago.

References 

1944 births
Living people
Acharyas
Trinidad and Tobago Hindus
20th-century Trinidad and Tobago physicians
United National Congress politicians
21st-century Trinidad and Tobago physicians
Trinidad and Tobago people of Indian descent